The 2012 European Cadet Judo Championships is an edition of the European Cadet Judo Championships, organised by the International Judo Federation. It was held in Bar, Montenegro from 22 to 24 June 2012.

Medal summary

Medal table

Men's events

Women's events

Source Results

References

External links
 

 U18
European Cadet Judo Championships
European Championships, U18
Judo
Judo competitions in Montenegro
Judo
Judo, European Championships U18